Costeño cheese is a dairy product from the Colombian Caribbean Region. It is fresh (or blanco), soft, and salty. Some harder varieties have more salt.

Production 

Raw milk is separated into solid curds and liquid whey by adding rennet, whey is separated, curds get hard, salt is added and then heated. A wooden bowl container called sereta and a press are used in the preparation.

See also
Arroz de lisa
Suero atollabuey
Butifarra Soledeñas
Bollo

References 

Colombian cheeses
Colombian cuisine